Masud Pathik (born 1 August 1979) is a Bangladeshi filmmaker, poet and lyricist. His feature films Nekabborer Mohaproyan (2014) won seven and Maya: The Lost Mother (2019) won eight Bangladesh National Film Awards. Individually, he won the Best Lyrics and Best Story awards. For his poetry, he won the 2013 HSBC Kali O Kalam award for his poem Ekaki Jomin.

Early life and education 
Pathik was born on 1 August 1979 at Raipura Upazila in Narsingdi District. He earned his PhD from the University of Dhaka on the topic of Bangladeshi Cinema. He took a film appreciation course in 2008 organised by Bishwo Shahitto Kendro in Dhaka. As of August 2020, he has been researching on film at Assam University.

Career
Pathik edits a magazine, Bratya, that focuses on the life and livelihood of the subaltern people of Bangladesh. He also acts as the assistant editor of Pothorekha, a literary magazine in Bangladesh, and he is an executive member of Jatiyo Kobita Parishad, Bangladesh. He is the founder and chairman of Bratya Film, and Bratya Creation.

Pathik's film  Nekabbarer Mahaproyan won seven National Film awards. The original winner of the Best Film Award, Brihonnola, was disqualified due to plagiarism.

His film Maya: The Lost Mother was based on artist Shahabuddin Ahmed's painting The Woman.

Pathik's first poem Krishokphool was  published in 1996. As of 2017,  he has published 14 books including Chashar Put, Ekaki Jomin, Shetu Harabar Din, Chashar Bachan, Langoler Bhubon and Dadar Khorom.

Filmography
2014 Nekabborer Mohaproyan (feature film)
2015 Alor Pother Sarothi (documentary)
2019 Maya: The Lost Mother (feature film)

Awards
 HSBC Kali O Kalam Award (2013)
 Bangladesh National Film Award for Best Lyrics (2014)
 Ritwik Ghatak  Memorial Award (2017)
 Bangladesh National Film Award for Best Story (2019)

References

External links 
 
 
 
 

Living people
1976 births
University of Dhaka alumni
Bangladeshi male poets
Bangladeshi film directors
Best Lyricist National Film Award (Bangladesh) winners
Best Story National Film Award (Bangladesh) winners